Specklinia striata is a species of orchid plant native to Colombia, Ecuador, French Guiana, Guyana, Panama, Suriname.

References 

striata
Flora of Colombia
Flora of Ecuador 
Flora of French Guiana
Flora of Guyana
Flora of Panama
Flora of Suriname